Sachie Ishizu was the defending champion, but lost to Tamarine Tanasugarn in the second round.
Chang Kai-chen won the title, defeating Mandy Minella 6–4, 1–6, 6–4 in the final.

Seeds

Main draw

Finals

Top half

Bottom half

References
 Main Draw
 Qualifying Draw

Kofu International Open - Singles